Christchurch South was a parliamentary electorate in the city of Christchurch, New Zealand from 1881 to 1890 and then from 1905 to 1946.

Population centres
The previous electoral redistribution was undertaken in 1875 for the 1875–1876 election. In the six years since, New Zealand's European population had increased by 65%. In the 1881 electoral redistribution, the House of Representatives increased the number of European representatives to 91 (up from 84 since the 1875–76 election). The number of Māori electorates was held at four. The House further decided that electorates should not have more than one representative, which led to 35 new electorates being formed, including Christchurch South, and two electorates that had previously been abolished to be recreated. This necessitated a major disruption to existing boundaries.

The boundaries of the Christchurch South electorate were Worcester Street in the north (through Latimer and Cathedral Squares), Fitzgerald Avenue in the east (then called East Town Belt), Moorhouse Avenue in the south (then called South Town Belt), and Hagley Avenue (then called Lincoln Road) and Rolleston Avenue (then called Antigua Street) in the west. The electorate thus comprised the southern half of what is now considered the central city.

History

Perceval won the election.

The 1939 Christchurch South by-election held on 3 June was caused by the death of Ted Howard during the term of the 26th New Zealand Parliament.  On nomination day, two candidates were put forward: Robert Macfarlane for the Labour Party and Melville Lyons for the National Party. Mabel Howard, Ted Howard's daughter, had hoped to be put forward by the Labour Party, and she was endorsed by the local branch of the party. The national executive of the Labour Party chose Macfarlane, and Howard believed that she was opposed by the party's hierarchy due to her connections to John A. Lee, who was seen as a radical within the party. The chosen candidate, Macfarlane, had been Mayor of Christchurch since the previous year. Macfarlane was the successful candidate.

Election results
The electorate was represented by five members of parliament.

Key

Election results

1943 election
There were six candidates in 1943, with the election won by Robert Macfarlane over Ron Guthrey.

1939 by-election

1931 election

1928 election

1914 election

1908 election

1905 election

References

Bibliography

 

1881 establishments in New Zealand
1946 disestablishments
Historical electorates of New Zealand
Politics of Christchurch
History of Christchurch
1905 establishments in New Zealand
1890 disestablishments in New Zealand
1946 disestablishments in New Zealand